Time For Change is the second album by American R&B singer Wendy Moten, released on February 22, 1995.

Overview
Although none of the album's singles charted in Moten's native United States or the United Kingdom where she had a Top 10 hit with "Come In Out of the Rain" the year before, the album did prove successful in Japan, where she scored two smash hits; "Change of Heart", which reached number 1, and "Your Love Is All I Know", which peaked at number 2.

Track listing

Personnel
Drums: Vinnie Colaiuta, Arthur Marbury
Percussion: Michael Fisher
Drum Programming: Dan Shea, Claude Gaudette
Bass guitar: Benjamin Skip Pruitt, Jackie Street
Keyboards, Piano: Paul D. Allen, Curtiss Boone, Vernon D. Fails, David Foster, Eddie Howard Jr., Michael J. Powell, Cheryl Rogers, Dan Shea, Aaron Zigman
String Conductor: Jeremy Lubbock
Synthesizer Programming: David Foster, Claude Gaudette, Tony Smith, Ren Klyce, Dan Shea, Gary Cirimelli
Synclavier Programming: Simon Franglen
Guitars: Cliff Downs, Dann Huff, Donnie Lyle, Michael J. Powell, Michael Thompson
Saxophone: Mark Douthit, Kirk Whalum
Flugelhorn: Gary Grant, Jerry Hey

1995 albums
Wendy Moten albums
EMI Records albums
Albums produced by David Foster
Albums produced by Michael J. Powell